The Courtship of Miles Standish, also known as The Courtship of Myles Standish, is a 1923 American silent epic historical romantic drama film about Myles Standish produced by and starring Charles Ray, Enid Bennett, and E. Alyn Warren. Directed by Frederic Sullivan, nephew of the famous composer Sir Arthur Sullivan, and scripted by Albert Ray, the film is based on Henry Wadsworth Longfellow's 1858  poem The Courtship of Miles Standish. No prints of the film are known to exist and it is now presumed lost.

Background and production
Actor Charles Ray had risen to fame in the mid to late 1910s playing young, wholesome fun country bumpkins in silent comedy films directed by Thomas H. Ince for Paramount Pictures. By 1920, Ray was earning $11,000 a week (approximately $ today). He left Paramount in 1920 after Adolph Zukor reportedly refused to give him a substantial raise, and formed his own production company, Charles Ray Productions. The company produced several fairly successful comedy films from 1920 to 1922, several of which were written by (and featured assistant direction from) Albert Ray, Charles Ray's first cousin.

By 1922, Ray had grown tired of playing country bumpkin roles and decided to reinvent himself as a dramatic actor in romantic leading man roles. Against the advice of producers and friends, Ray chose to make a historical epic costume drama based on Henry Wadsworth Longfellow's 1858 narrative poem The Courtship of Miles Standish.

After failing to secure financial backing from a major studio, Ray put up $500,000 of his own money to fund the project. The scenario for the film, taken from Longfellow's poem, was written by Albert Ray, with direction by Frederic Sullivan (although all creative decisions on the film rested entirely with Charles Ray himself).

The film was shot in part at the Charles Ray Studio located on Sunset Boulevard (now known as the KCET Studios) in Los Angeles which Ray purchased shortly after leaving Paramount in 1920. On one of the studio's sound stages, Ray had a 180-ton rocking replica of the Mayflower built that cost a reported $65,000 (approximately $ today). Other sequences were shot in Lake Arrowhead, California where Ray had three full sized log cabins built solely for exterior shots. By the end of filming, Ray had spent over $1 million of his own money and the film's budget reportedly rose to a reported $3 million  (approximately $ today).

Cast

Reception
Upon its release, The Courtship of Miles Standish received some favorable reviews from critics, but was not well received by audiences. Frederick James Smith described the film as "merely dull" and that "the acting is not much." Smith wrote, "Ray seems oppressed by the historical significance of John, and he allots himself entirely too much film. Enid Bennett makes Priscilla a simpering and almost insufferable ingenue." The film was a box office failure, losing $1 million and effectively ruining Charles Ray's career.  Ray's production company went bankrupt and he was forced to declare personal bankruptcy. For his part, Frederic Sullivan never directed another film.

Ray's career would never rebound from the failure of The Courtship of Miles Standish. He continued acting, but appeared in smaller budget productions, in supporting roles. During the sound era, Ray appeared in bit parts and filed for bankruptcy a second time in 1934. He died of a systemic infection in November 1943.

References

External links

Token or movie medallion issued for film at coinpeople.com

1923 films
1923 romantic drama films
1920s historical romance films
American romantic drama films
American silent feature films
American black-and-white films
American epic films
Cultural depictions of British men
Films based on poems
Films based on works by Henry Wadsworth Longfellow
Films set in the 1620s
Films set in Massachusetts
Films set in the Thirteen Colonies
Films shot in California
Films shot in Los Angeles
American independent films
Lost American films
Associated Exhibitors films
American historical romance films
1920s independent films
1923 lost films
Lost romantic drama films
1920s American films
Silent romantic drama films
Silent adventure films
Silent American drama films
1920s English-language films
Silent historical romance films